The Heart of a Hero is a surviving 1916 silent film historical drama based upon the 1898 play Nathan Hale by Clyde Fitch, directed by Emile Chautard and starring Robert Warwick and Gail Kane. It was produced and distributed by World Film Corporation.

Prints exist at George Eastman House and the Library of Congress.

Plot
The story of Nathan Hale, an American soldier and spy from his days as a teacher to his eventual capture and execution.

Cast
Robert Warwick - Nathan Hale
Gail Kane - Alice Adams
Alec B. Francis - Colonel Knowlton
George MacQuarrie - Guy Fitzroy
Clifford Grey - Tom Adams
Henry West - Cunningham
Charles Jackson - Thomas Jefferson
Clara Whipple - Widow Chichester
Mildred Havens - Amy Brandon
Herbert Evans - William Howe

See also
Cardigan (1922)
America (1924)
 List of films about the American Revolution
 List of television series and miniseries about the American Revolution

References

External links

1916 films
Films directed by Emile Chautard
World Film Company films
American silent feature films
American black-and-white films
American historical drama films
American Revolutionary War films
1910s historical drama films
1916 drama films
American films based on plays
Articles containing video clips
Cultural depictions of Thomas Jefferson
1910s American films
Silent American drama films